Jean-Henri Pape, born as Johann Heinrich Pape and also known as Henry Pape (1 July 1789 – 2 February 1875), was a distinguished French maker of pianos and harps in the early 19th century.

Pape was born in Sarstedt, Germany, in 1789. He arrived in Paris in 1811 and secured employment with Pleyel, whose piano workshops he directed for several years. In 1815, he established his own manufacture of pianos, and almost annually for nearly forty years improved them with new inventions. His first grand pianos followed the English system of Broadwood and Tomkinson, though endowed with mechanical genius it was not long before he modified, then completely changed their principles of construction. Pape concentrated on defects in square and grand pianos caused by the structural gap between the sounding board and wrest plank allowing the hammers to strike the strings; the solution of placing actions above the strings had been imagined by Marius, then Hildebrand and finally Streicher in Vienna, but instead of levers and counterweights Pape's arrangement used a coil spring to raise the hammers quickly and with almost no effect on touch. This system was very successful in squares but lacked some lightness and delicacy in grand pianos. The variations he introduced in the forms and actions of upright pianos gave his instruments remarkable power.

The work of this skilled maker was rewarded by favourable reports of his instruments from the Société d’encouragement pour l’industrie nationale on 19 September 1832 and from l'Académie des beaux-arts de l'institut de France in 1833, and he earned a gold medal at the French Industrial Exposition of 1834, as well as a medal of the Legion of Honor in 1839. Skilled in every aspect of mechanics, Pape invented a machine used to saw wood or ivory in spirals, and exhibited its results in 1827. One of his pianos was veneered with sheets of ivory nine feet long and two feet wide. A small pamphlet commemorated his contributions to the instrument (Notice sur les inventions et perfectionnements apportes par H. Pape dans la fabrication des pianos, Paris: Loquin: 11 pages with three lithographic plates).

Pape could not cope with the increasing industrialisation in the production of pianos. When he died in 1875 in the Paris suburb of Asnières-sur-Seine, where he had continued research into the construction of the instrument, he was impoverished. For some time his son and nephew managed the factory he founded.

References

F.J. Fétis: Biographie universelle des musiciens (Paris: Didot frères, 1867; rev. ed. 1880)

External links
 Société d’encouragement pour l’industrie nationale
 Cité de la musique, maker's entry

1789 births
1875 deaths
19th-century French inventors
French musical instrument makers
Harp makers
People from Sarstedt
Piano makers